Perhat Turdi (born August 1957) is a Chinese politician of Kyrgyz ethnicity who served as governor of Kizilsu Kyrgyz Autonomous Prefecture and chairman of the People's Congress of Kizilsu Kyrgyz Autonomous Prefecture.

Biography
Perhat Turdi was born in Akto County, Xinjiang, in August 1957. In September 1973, he worked as a sent-down youth at the Cadre Farm of Akto County. Two years later, he was accepted to Xinjiang Finance and Trade School, and was assigned to Aktao County Taxation Bureau after graduation. He joined the Chinese Communist Party in December 1986. In January 1991, he was despatched to Aktao County Labor and Personnel Bureau as deputy head. He was promoted to be deputy mayor of the Finance Bureau of Kizilsu Kyrgyz Autonomous Prefecture in May 1993, concurrently holding the party branch secretary position since February 1998. In February 2000, he was transferred to Akqi County and appointed deputy party secretary and magistrate. In January 2002, he became assistant governor of Kizilsu Kyrgyz Autonomous Prefecture. He rose to become deputy governor in January 2003, rising to governor in January 2007. In June 2016, he took office as chairman of the People's Congress of Kizilsu Kyrgyz Autonomous Prefecture, and served until 2022.

References

1957 births
Living people
People from Akto County
Chinese people of Kyrgyzstani descent
Tianjin University alumni
People's Republic of China politicians from Xinjiang
Chinese Communist Party politicians from Xinjiang
Governors of Kizilsu Kyrgyz Autonomous Prefecture